Dating to the Carboniferous period, the Purgatory Conglomerate is a geologic formation in Rhode Island.

References

Carboniferous geology of Rhode Island